Ožďany is a village and municipality in the Rimavská Sobota District of the Banská Bystrica Region of southern Slovakia.

Local high school played an important role in the Slovak history, some important persons of Slovak literary and political life of the 19th century made their studies here, like Štefan Marko Daxner, Ján Botto and Ján Francisci-Rimavský.

Nearby cities and villages : Hrnčiarske Zalužany, Husiná and Kružno.

In the village are located gym hall, football pitch, kindergarten and elementary school. Most important sightseeings are evangelical and Roman Catholic church, manor houses and historical mill.

References

External links
 
 
 http://www.e-obce.sk/obec/ozdany/4-kulturne_dedicstvo.html
 Information about Ožďany mill

Villages and municipalities in Rimavská Sobota District